Sjoukje Maria Diderika Troelstra-Bokma de Boer (13 February 1860 – 9 January 1939), better known under her pseudonym Nienke van Hichtum, was a well-known Frisian Dutch children's author and translator. From 1888 to 1904, she was married to the socialist leader Pieter Jelles Troelstra. The couple had two children: a daughter, Dieuwke and a son, Jelle. Her son Jelle Troelstra (1891–1979) was a sculptor and graphic designer.   

She was born in Nes to Albertus Minderts Bokma de Boer and Dieuwke Jans Klaasesz. , the fifth and last daughter of a preacher.    

Van Hichtum wrote books and stories in both West Frisian (her native language) and Dutch. The biennial Dutch literary award Nienke van Hichtum-prijs is named after her.

Bibliography
 1887 – Teltsjes yn skimerjoun
 1897 – Sip-su, "de knappe jongen" (Sip-su, the handsome boy)
 1898 – Uit verre landen (From faraway countries)
 1898 – De geschiedenis van den kleinen Eskimo Kudlago (The history of little Eskimo Kudlago)
 1899 – Hoe een kleine Kafferjongen page bij de koning werd (How the little kaffir boy became page to the king)
 1900 – Oehoehoe in de wildernis (Oehoehoe in the wild)
 1901 – Een Kafferse heldin (A kaffir heroine)
 1903 – Afke's Tiental (Afke's Ten)
 1957 – Reissued as De tsien fan Martens Afke (The ten of Martens Afke)
 1905 – Friesche schetsen (Frisian sketches)
 1905 – Het apenboek (The monkeybook)
 1908 – Der wier ris in âld wyfke
 1908 – Er was eens een oud vrouwtje (Once upon a time there was an old lady)
 1911 – Moeders vertellingen (Mother's tales)
 1911 – Kajakmannen, Groenlandsche avonturen (naverteld)
 1913 – Oude en nieuwe verhalen (Old and new stories)
 1918 – De tooverhoed (neiferteld) (The magic hat)
 1920 – Gouden sprookjes van gebrs. Grimm (naverteld) (Fairytales of gold by the Grimm brothers)
 1921 – Vertellingen uit de Duizend en één nacht (bewerking) (Tales of 1001 nights)
 1922 – Het groot vertelselboek (The big book of tales)
 1923 – Het leven en de wonderbare lotgevallen van Robinson Crusoë (naverteld)
 1924 – Jetse, een Friesche vertelling (Later uitgebreid tot Jelle van Sipke-Froukjes.)
 1924 – De verstandige poedel (The wise poodle)
 1929 – Winnie de Poeh, voor Nederlandse kinderen naverteld door Nienke van Hichtum (Winnie the Pooh, told by Nienke van Hichtum for Dutch children)
 1930 – De prinses op de erwt (naverteld) (The princess on the pea)
 1932 – Jelle van Sipke-Froukjes
 1932 – Oom Remus vertelt sprookjes van de oude plantage aan den kleinen jongen. (bewerking)
 1933 – Russische sprookjes (Russian fairytales)
 1936 – Schimmels voor de koets of ... vlooien voor de koekepan?
 1937 – Drie van de oude plaats (Three of the old place)
1950 – Reissued as Jonge Jaike fan it Aldhiem (Young Jaike of the old home)
 1937 – Oude bekenden (Old acquaintances)
 2003 – Reissued as Alde kunde, in mearkeboek (Old patron, a fairy tale)
 1939 – Nienke van Hichtum vertelt weer (Nienke van Hichtum tells tales again)
 1939 – De jonge priiskeatser. Friese versie van Jelle van Sipke-Froukjes. (The young pricecat)
 1948 – Geplukte bloemetjes, een bundel heel kleine verhaaltjes (Picked flowers, a collection of very tiny tales)
 – Vier duizend kilometer door de Poolwoestijn (Four thousand kilometers through the arctic desert)
 – Sprookjes van Hauff (Hauff's fairytales)
 – Zwarte Jacob van den Valkenburg (Black Jacob van den Valkensburg)

External links
 

1860 births
1939 deaths
19th-century Dutch women writers
19th-century Dutch writers
Dutch children's writers
People from Dongeradeel
Dutch women children's writers
20th-century Dutch women writers
20th-century Dutch writers